"Come to Me" is a #1 disco hit from 1979 performed by France Joli, who had recorded it at the age of fifteen with producer, Tony Green, who composed the song and briefly sings on it. The track also features the famed Philadelphia session vocalists, The Sweethearts of Sigma Sound. The song was introduced on the 1979 album France Joli, which was released in the US on 17 April 1979 on Prelude, and rose to #26. "Come to Me" received a major boost on 7 July when Joli performed it as a last minute replacement for Donna Summer at a concert held on Fire Island, whose estimated audience numbered 5,000. "Come to Me" began a three-week reign atop the Billboard Hot Dance Club Play chart on 22 September 1979. "Come to Me" peaked  at #15 on the Hot 100 and at #36 on the R&B  chart.

References

External links
Lyrics to this song at Lyrics Translate

1979 singles
Disco songs
1979 songs
Prelude Records (record label) singles